John Maddocks (born 7 January 1958) is a British sailor. He competed in the Star event at the 1984 Summer Olympics.

References

External links
 

1958 births
Living people
British male sailors (sport)
Olympic sailors of Great Britain
Sailors at the 1984 Summer Olympics – Star
Sportspeople from Reading, Berkshire